The foreign relations of Switzerland are the primary responsibility of the Federal Department of Foreign Affairs (FDFA). Some international relations of Switzerland are handled by other departments of the federal administration of Switzerland.

History

Article 54 of the Swiss Constitution of 1999 declares the safeguarding of Switzerland's independence and welfare as the principal objective of Swiss foreign policy. Below this overarching goal, the Constitution specifies these foreign policy objectives:
alleviate need and poverty in the world;
promote respect for human rights and democracy;
promote the peaceful coexistence of peoples;
promote preservation of natural resources.

These objectives reflect the Swiss moral obligation to undertake social, economic, and humanitarian activities that contribute to world peace and prosperity. This is manifested by Swiss bilateral and multilateral diplomatic activity, assistance to developing countries, and support for the extension of international law, particularly humanitarian law.

Traditionally, Switzerland has avoided alliances that might entail military, political, or direct economic action. Only in recent years have the Swiss broadened the scope of activities in which they feel able to participate without compromising their neutrality. Switzerland is not a member of the European Union and joined the United Nations very late compared to its European neighbours.

Switzerland maintains diplomatic relations with almost all countries and historically has served as a neutral intermediary and host to major international treaty conferences. The country has no major dispute in its bilateral relations.

Switzerland (mainly Geneva) is home to many international governmental and nongovernmental organisations, including the International Olympic Committee, the International Committee of the Red Cross and the European Broadcasting Union. One of the first international organisations, the Universal Postal Union, is located in Bern.

United Nations

On 10 September 2002, Switzerland became a full member of the United Nations, after a referendum supporting full membership won in a close vote six months earlier;
Swiss voters had rejected membership by a 3-to-1 margin in 1986. The 2002 vote made Switzerland the first country to join based on a popular vote. Conversely, on 17 May 1992, Swiss voters approved by a healthy margin (55 percent in favour) the decision to join the IMF and the World Bank. Less than two weeks later, but a full two years after the initial application, Switzerland finally became a member of the IMF on 29 May of that same year.

Prior to its formal accession to the United Nations, Switzerland had maintained an observer role at the UN's General Assembly and its Economic and Social Council. Prior to full membership it had no right to a seat as one of the elected members of the UN Security Council. Switzerland was elected as a member of the United Nations Security Council for the period 2023-2024 on 9 June 2022. Switzerland says it intends to play its role as a "bridge builder". Other stated priorities are peace building, supporting women into the political process, minorities rights and human rights and more transparency from the Security Council.

Switzerland has fully participated within many of the UN's specialised institutions, including the Economic Commission for Europe, United Nations Environment Programme, the UN High Commissioner for Refugees, UN Educational, Scientific and Cultural Organization, UN Conference on Trade and Development, UN Industrial Development Organization, and the Universal Postal Union.  Switzerland has also furnished military observers and medical teams to several UN operations.

Switzerland is a party to the Statute of the International Court of Justice.

Support of UN sanctions
The Swiss government on 25 June 2003, eased most of the sanctions against the Republic of Iraq in accord with UN Security Council Resolution (UNSCR) 1483. The government lifted the trade embargo, flight restrictions, and financial sanctions in place since August 1990. The weapons embargo and the asset freeze, the scope of which was extended, remain in force, and restrictions on the trade in Iraqi cultural goods were newly imposed. Though not a member at the time, Switzerland had joined UN sanctions against Iraq after the invasion of Kuwait.

Switzerland also has joined UN economic sanctions imposed on Libya, Sierra Leone, UNITA (Angola), Liberia, and Serbia/Montenegro. On 15 October 2003, the Federal Council ended the import restrictions on raw diamonds from Sierra Leone and lifted sanctions against Libya.

Switzerland in October 2000 implemented an ordinance to enforce UN sanctions against the Taliban (UNSCR 1267), which it subsequently amended in April 2001 in accord with tighter UN regulations (UNSCR 1333). On 2 May 2002, the Swiss Government eased the sanctions regime in accord with UNSCR 1388 and 1390, lifting the ban on the sale of acetic acid (used in drug production), Afghan airlines, and Afghan diplomatic representations. The weapons embargo, travel restrictions, and financial sanctions remain in force.

The Swiss Government in November 2001 issued an ordinance declaring illegal the terrorist organisation Al-Qaeda as well as possible successor or supporting organisations. More than 200 individuals or companies linked to international terrorism have been blacklisted to have their assets frozen. Thus far, Swiss authorities have blocked about 72 accounts totalling U.S.$22.6 million.

EU and other international organizations
Switzerland and Denmark signed a treaty of Friendship in 1875. 
Switzerland is a member of many international organisations, including the World Trade Organization, Organisation for Economic Co-operation and Development, European Free Trade Association, Council of Europe, Organization for Security and Cooperation in Europe, International Atomic Energy Agency, and International Telecommunications Satellite Organization. Its central bank is a member of the Bank for International Settlements, based in Basel.

Switzerland is an active participant in the Organization for Security and Co-operation in Europe, its foreign minister serving as Chairman-in-Office for 1996. Switzerland also is an active participant in the major nonproliferation and export control regimes.

Although it is surrounded by member nations, Switzerland is not a member nation of the European Union. In 1992 Swiss voters approved membership in the International Monetary Fund and the World Bank, but later that year rejected the European Economic Area agreement, which the government viewed as a first step toward European Union membership. The Swiss instead take part in the European single market and Schengen through bilateral treaties.More complete list of memberships:
ACCT, AfDB, AsDB, Australia Group, BIS, CE, CERN, CGPM, EAPC, EBRD, ECE, EFTA, ESA, FAO, G-10, IADB, IAEA, IBRD (World Bank), ICAO, ICC, ICC, ICDO, ICFTU, ICMM, ICRM, IDA, IEA, IFAD, IFC, IFCS, IFRCS, IGC, ILO, IMF, IMO, Inmarsat, Intelsat, Interpol, IOC, IOM, ISO, ITU, IWC, LAIA (observer), NAM (guest), NEA, NSG, OAS (observer), OECD, OIE, OPCW, OSCE, OTIF, PCA, PFP, UNCTAD, UNESCO, UNHCR, UNIDO, UNITAR, UNMIBH, UNMIK, UNMOP, UNOMIG, UNTSO, UNU, UPU, WCL, WCO, WHO, WIPO, WMO, WToO, WTrO, ZC.

Participation in peacekeeping
While the Swiss electorate did reject a government proposition to directly deploy Swiss troops as UN peacekeepers (the Blue Helmets) in 1994, a total of 23 Swiss personnel including police and military observers (the Blue Berets) have served or are now serving for the United Nations. These dispositions are impartial, clearly defined and cover a number of UN projects around the globe.

In 1996 Switzerland joined NATO's Partnership for Peace, the Euro-Atlantic Partnership Council in 1997, and deployed Yellow Berets to support the OSCE in Bosnia. In June 2001, Swiss voters approved new legislation providing for the deployment of armed Swiss troops for international peacekeeping missions under UN or OSCE auspices as well as closer international cooperation in military training.

Since 1999, the Swiss army is participating through SWISSCOY in the peace keeping mission of the Kosovo Force (KFOR) based on UN-resolution 1244, with prolonged presence until 2014, after approval by the Swiss federal assembly in Spring 2011. Main duties include the supervision of civilian reconstruction efforts, monitoring and protection of patrimonial sites, military police and medical assistance.

Representation of foreign entities and in foreign disputes

Under a series of treaties concluded after the First World War, Switzerland assumed responsibility for the diplomatic and consular representation of Liechtenstein, the protection of its borders, and the regulation of its customs.

Due to its long-standing neutrality, Switzerland has served as the protecting power for many countries, that did not have diplomatic relations with each other. This reached an apex during the Second World War, when Switzerland formally undertook 219 mandates for 35 states, and represented another eight states unofficially. After the Second World War, Switzerland served an additional 67 mandates for various countries, including those between Cuba and other nations in the Western Hemisphere after the 1959 Cuban Revolution, between Middle Eastern nations following the outbreak of the Yom Kippur War in 1973, and between India and Pakistan prior to the formalization of relations in 1976.

Switzerland also represented Cuba in the United States between 1991 and 2015.

Today, Switzerland has seven protecting power mandates: 
 United States interests in both Cuba (until 2015) and Iran
 Cuban interest in the United States (until 2015)
 Iranian interests in both Canada and Egypt
 Saudi Arabian and Iranian interests with each other
 Georgian and Russian interests with each other

Switzerland played a key role in brokering a truce agreement between the Sudanese Government and Sudan People's Liberation Army for the Nuba Mountains region, signed after a week's negotiations taking place near Lucerne in January 2002. Switzerland has also sent services to allied troops in the War in Afghanistan.

Switzerland is also playing a major role in Palestinian politics, trying to act as a mediator between Fatah and Hamas regarding the integration of employees in Gaza. The Swiss diplomatic efforts lead to an agreement called "the Swiss Document" which initially was approved by both Palestinian parties.

Following the 2022 Russian invasion of Ukraine, Switzerland decided to adopt all EU sanctions against Russia. According to the Swiss President Ignazio Cassis, the measures were "unprecedented but consistent with Swiss neutrality". The administration also confirmed that Switzerland would continue to offer its services to find a peaceful solution in the conflict. Switzerland only participates in humanitarian missions and provides relief supplies to the Ukrainian population and neighbouring countries. In August 2022, Russia rejected a proposed Swiss mandate to represent Ukrainian interests in Russia, considering that Switzerland had lost its neutral status.

Diplomatic representations
Diplomatic representations of Switzerland: Official list
Diplomatic representations in Switzerland: Official list

Bilateral relations

Africa

Americas

Asia

Europe

Oceania

See also
Diplomatic Documents of Switzerland
List of diplomatic missions in Switzerland
List of diplomatic missions of Switzerland
Politics of Switzerland

References

External links
Swiss Department of Foreign Affairs.
Swiss Diplomatic Documents (DDS)
Switzerland and the United Nations
Bilateral relations Switzerland – Liechtenstein 
 The Geneva School of Diplomacy & International Relations

 
Government of Switzerland
Politics of Switzerland